Campo Largo is a town in the province of Chaco, Argentina, and the capital of the department of Independencia. The population in 2001 was 10,743.

External links

Populated places in Chaco Province